Loten, Løten, or Löten may refer to:

People 
 Tom Loten (born 1999), an English cricketer
 Loten Namling, an Indian-born singer, musician artist, entertainer and cartoonist living in Switzerland
 Joan Gideon Loten (1710-1789), a Dutch civil servant in the colonies of the Dutch East India Company

Places
 Løten, a municipality in Innlandet county, Norway
 Løten (village), a village in the municipality of Løten in Innlandet county, Norway
 Løten Church, a church in the municipality of Løten in Innlandet county, Norway
 Løten Station, a railway station in the village of Løten in Løten municipality in Innlandet county, Norway
 Löten Church, a church located at Heidenstam Square, in Uppsala, Sweden

Other
 Loten, the trade name for Atenolol
 Løten FK, a football club in the municipality of Løten in Innlandet county, Norway
 Loten's sunbird, a sunbird endemic to India and Sri Lanka